The Nordic combined event at the 1992 Winter Olympics consisted of two athletic disciplines (ski jumping and cross-country skiing), held from 11 February to 17 February. The ski jumping portion and the 15 km cross-country portion of the Nordic Combined event were both held at Courchevel-le Praz. A temporary cross-country stadium was constructed in a field directly adjacent (east) to the Tremplin du Praz ski jump outrun. All other cross-country and Biathlon competitions were held at Les Saisies.

Medal summary

Medal table

France and Japan, two nations that had never won a medal in Olympic Nordic combined, topped the medal table, each winning one gold, with the French adding a silver as well.

Events

Participating NOCs

Twelve nations participated in Nordic combined at the Albertville Games. Estonia made their Olympic Nordic combined debut, and the Unified Team made their only appearance.

References

 
1992 Winter Olympics events
1992
1992 in Nordic combined
Nordic combined competitions in France
Men's events at the 1992 Winter Olympics